Abbott Laboratories is an American multinational medical devices and health care company with headquarters in Abbott Park, Illinois, United States. The company was founded by Chicago physician Wallace Calvin Abbott in 1888 to formulate known drugs; today, it sells medical devices, diagnostics, branded generic medicines and nutritional products. It split off its research-based pharmaceuticals business into AbbVie in 2013. The CEO of Abbott said in 2015 that the company had been in India for over a century; it was named Abbott India Ltd. in 2002.

Abbott's products include Pedialyte, Similac, BinaxNOW, Ensure, Glucerna, ZonePerfect, FreeStyle Libre, i-STAT and MitraClip.

History

Foundation and early history 

In 1888 at the age of 30, Wallace Abbott (1857–1921), an 1885 graduate of the University of Michigan, founded the Abbott Alkaloidal Company in Ravenswood, Chicago. At the time, he was a practising physician and owned a drug store. His innovation was formulating the active part of alkaloid  medicinal plants—morphine, quinine, strychnine and codeine—as tiny "dosimetric granules", producing more consistent and effective dosages for patients than the liquid preparations previously used, which deteriorated over time. In 1922, the company moved from Ravenswood to North Chicago, Illinois.

International expansion 
Abbott's first international affiliate was in London in 1907; the company later added an affiliate in Montreal, Canada. Abbott India Ltd was originally incorporated on August 22, 1944, as Boots Pure Drug Company (India) Ltd. The company name was changed to The Boots Company (India) Ltd on November 1, 1971, and to Boots Pharmaceuticals Ltd on January 1, 1991. On October 31, 1995, the name was changed to Knoll Pharmaceuticals Ltd and on July 1, 2002, to their present name Abbott India Ltd.I  Abbott started operations in Pakistan as a marketing affiliate in 1948; the company has steadily expanded to comprise a work force of over 1500 employees. Currently, two manufacturing facilities located at Landhi and Korangi in Karachi continue to produce pharmaceutical products. In 1962  Abbott entered into a joint venture with Dainippon Pharmaceutical Co., Ltd., of Osaka, Japan, to manufacture radio-pharmaceuticals. In 1964, it merged with Ross Laboratories, making Ross a wholly owned subsidiary of Abbott, and Richard Ross gained a seat on Abbott's board of directors until his retirement in 1983. The acquisition of Ross brought Similac under the Abbott umbrella. In the years following the acquisition, Pedialyte and Ensure were introduced as nutritional products by Ross Laboratories while under Abbott's leadership.

In 1965, Abbott's expansion in Europe continued with offices in Italy and France.

According to Harvard professor Lester Grinspoon and Peter Hedblom, "In 1966 Abbott Laboratories sold the equivalent of two million doses of methamphetamine in powder form to a Long Island criminal dealer".

21st century 
In 2001, the company acquired Knoll, the pharmaceutical division of BASF. In 2002, it divested the Selsun Blue brand to Chattem. Later in 2002, it sold Clear Eyes and Murine to Prestige Brands. In 2004,  it acquired TheraSense, a diabetes-care company, which it merged with its MediSense division to become Abbott Diabetes Care. In 2006, Abbott assisted Boston Scientific in its purchase of Guidant Corporation purchasing the vascular device division of Guidant.

In 2007, Abbott acquired Kos Pharmaceuticals for $3.7 billion in cash. At the time of acquisition Kos marketed Niaspan (extended release niacin), and Advicor (niacin/lovastatin).

In 2007 the company was to sell two diagnostics divisions to General Electric, but the parties did not agree on the terms of the acquisition.

On 8 September 2007, the company sold the UK manufacturing plant at Queenborough to UK manufacturer Aesica Pharmaceuticals.

Abbott's Ross Products was renamed Abbott Nutrition in 2007.

In 2009 Abbott acquired Advanced Medical Optics of Santa Ana, California, selling it to Johnson & Johnson in 2017. In 2009, Abbott opened a satellite research and development facility at Research Park, University of Illinois at Urbana-Champaign.

In February 2010, Abbott acquired the pharmaceuticals unit of Solvay S.A. for US$6.2 billion (€4.5 billion), gaining many additional pharmaceutical products and an increased presence in emerging markets.

In 2010 the company acquired Hollywood, Florida-based laboratory information management system company STARLIMS for $123 million, $14 per share. That year Abbott said it would buy Piramal Healthcare of India's large generic drugs unit for $3.72 billion.

Spin-offs 
In 2004, Abbott spun off its hospital products division into a new 14,000 employee company, Hospira, which was acquired by Pfizer in 2015.

In October 2011, Abbott planned to separate into two companies, one for research-based pharmaceuticals (AbbVie) and the other for medical devices, generic drugs sold internationally, and diagnostics, with the latter retaining the Abbott name. Abbott Nutrition, whose products include Similac, Pedialyte, Glucerna, and Ensure, also retained the Abbott name. In preparation for the reorganization, Abbott made severe budget cuts and took a $478 million charge in Q3-2012. The separation was effective as of 1 January 2013, and AbbVie was listed in the New York Stock Exchange.

Further developments 
On 16 May 2014, it was announced that Abbott would acquire the holding company Kalo Pharma Internacional S.L. for $2.9 billion in order to secure the 73% it held of Chilean pharmaceutical company, CFR Pharmaceuticals, which the company said would more than double its branded generic drug portfolio.

In December 2014, the company acquired Russian pharmaceutical manufacturer Veropharm (Voronezh) in a deal worth $410 million, which included three manufacturing facilities. Abbott, which already employed 1,400 people in Russia, said it planned to set up a manufacturing presence in the country when the deal closed.

In September 2015, the company announced it had completed its acquisition of Tendyne Holdings, Inc., a private medical device company focused on developing minimally invasive mitral valve replacement therapies. Tendyne was acquired for a total transaction value of $250 million. In January 2020, the Tendyne Mitral Valve became the world's first commercially available solution for Mitral Valve Replacement Technology. Abbott obtained CE Mark for the device which now makes it possible to implant it in Europe outside of a clinical setting. The US clinical study for federal approval is still ongoing.

In February 2016, the company announced it would acquire Alere for $5.8 billion. In January 2017, Abbott announced it would acquire St. Jude Medical for $25 billion (each share receiving $46.75 in cash & 0.8708 shares of Abbott common stock, equating to an approximate value of $85). On 3 October 2017, the company closed the Alere acquisition making the surviving entity the market leader player in the $7 billion point-of-care diagnostic space within the broader $50 billion in-vitro diagnostics market with this takeover. With the acquisition of Alere, the company also obtained the subsidiary Arriva Medical, which is the largest mail-order diabetic supplier. Arriva Medical announced business closure after Abbott acquisition effective 31 December 2017.

In 2017, the FDA approved Abbott's FreeStyle Libre glucose monitoring system,  which reads glucose levels through a self-applied sensor without finger pricks.

In August 2018, Reuters reported that Abbott Laboratories was among the top five companies for branded generic drugs in Russia.

In November 2018, Abbott received United States FDA clearance for FreeStyle LibreLink, a glucose reader smartphone app.

In January 2019 purchased Cephea Valve Technologies, Inc. which is developing a less-invasive replacement heart valve for people with mitral valve disease.

In March 2020, Abbott received emergency use authorization (EUA) from the US FDA for a SARS-CoV-2 test during the COVID-19 pandemic. The tester is small (comparable to a small toaster), and produces results within 13 minutes. Detroit received these tests on April 1, 2020. Also in March, the firm received EUA for a molecular COVID-19 test that runs on its m2000 RealTime lab-based platform. In April 2020, itt received EUA from the FDA for its third COVID-19 test, an antibody test that helps detect the IgG antibody to SARS-CoV-2 using the company's ARCHITECT laboratory instruments. In May 2020, it received EUA from the FDA for another lab-based COVID-19 antibody test that helps detect the IgG antibody to SARS-CoV-2 using the company's Alinity i system. Also in May, it received EUA from the FDA for a molecular COVID-19 test for use on the company's Alinity molecular laboratory instrument.

In August 2020, Abbott received EUA from the FDA for its credit-card-sized $5, 15-minute, portable COVID-19 antigen test, BinaxNOW,  compatible with the  NAVICA mobile app.

In October 2020, Abbott received EUA from the FDA for its lab-based COVID-19 IgM antibody blood test.
In December 2020, its rapid (20') antigen BinaxNOW COVID-19 test received EUA from the FDA for home use.
Forbes reported in January 2021 that the  firm had delivered more than 400 million COVID-19 tests, 300 million in the fourth quarter of 2020.

In September 2021, Abbott acquired Walk Vascular, LLC.

In January 2022, Abbott introduced Lingo, a line of consumer biowearable sensors that collects a range of biological readings to optimize exercise and nutrition regimens.  

In May 2022, Abbott received 510(k) clearance from the FDA for FreeStyle Libre 3, the latest version of its continuous glucose monitor.

In August 2022, Abbott received FDA approval for Proclaim Plus, a multi-use spinal cord stimulation system designed to target chronic pain. The Proclaim Plus system is capable of treating six independent pain sites and has a recharge-free battery life of up to 10 years. 

In October 2022, Abbott received EUA from the FDA for its real-time PCR test Alinity m MPXV; this marks the first FDA emergency authorization for commercial monkeypox testing.

Today, Abbott operates in over 160 countries.

Acquisition history

 Abbott Laboratories (Est. 1885, Abbott Alkaloidal Company)
 Ross Laboratories (Acq 1964)
 SmithKline Beecham (Acq 1982, later sold)
 Knoll (Acq 2001)
 Selsun Blue (Sold to Chattem 2002)
 Murine (Sold to Prestige Brands2002)
 Clear Eyes (Sold to Prestige Brands2002)
 i-STAT (Acq 2004)
 TheraSense (Acq 2004)
 Guidant (vascular device division) (Acq 2006)
 IntraLase Corp (Acq 2007)
 Advanced Medical Optics (Acq 2009)
 Solvay Pharmaceuticals (Acq 2010)
 STARLIMS (Acq 2010)
 Lab Data Management Ltd (Acq 2008)
 IDEV Technologies (Acq 2013)
 OptiMedica Corporation (Acq 2013)
 Veropharm (Acq 2014)
 Topera, Inc (Acq 2014)
 Kalo Pharma Internacional S.L. (Acq 2014)
 CFR Pharmaceuticals
 Tendyne Holdings Inc. (Acq 2015)
 Alere (Acq 2016)
 Epocal, Inc. (Acq 2013)
 Arriva Medical (Acq 2012)
 St. Jude Medical (Est 1976, Acq 2016)
 Pacesetter, Inc. (Acq 1994)
 Daig Corporation (Acq 1996)
 Heart Valve Company (Acq 1996)
 Biocor Industria (Acq 1996)
 Ventritex (Acq 1997)
  Tyco International (Angio-Seal division) (Acq 1999)
 Endocardial Solutions (Acq 2005)
 Advanced Neuromodulation Systems (Acq 2005)
 MediGuide (Acq 2008)
 AGA Medical (Acq 2010)
 LightLab Imaging (Acq 2010)
 Nanostim Inc (Acq 2013)
 Endosense (Acq 2013)
 CardioMEMS Inc. (Acq 2014)
 Spinal Modulation (Acq 2015)
 Thoratec Corporation (Acq 2015)
 Apica Cardiovascular Limited (Acq 2014)
 Levitronix (Medical division) (Acq 2011)
 Getinge Group (Heat pump technology division) (Acq 2014)
 Thermo Cardiosystems (Acq 2010)
 Cephea Valve Technologies, Inc. (Acq 2019)
 Walk Vascular, LLC (Acq 2021)
 Cardiovascular Systems, Inc. (Acq 2023)

Finances

Accounts
For the fiscal year 2021, Abbott Laboratories reported earnings of US$7.071 billion, with an annual revenue of US$43.075 billion, which grew 24.5% on an organic basis versus the year prior. Abbott's year-end 2021 stock price was $140.74.

Taxation

On 19 March 2019, it was reported that Abbott was a long-term user of the Double Irish tax structure, a legal but controversial Irish taxation tool used by US multinationals to reduce US corporate taxes on non-U.S profits. Abbott's Irish holding company, the Bermuda-resident Abbott Laboratories Vascular Enterprises (ALVE), employed no staff in 2017, but was responsible for distributing Abbot's products and licensing its technology worldwide. Newly filed accounts showed that ALVE was incorporated in 2003 and had a pre-tax profit of €2 billion in 2016 and 2017 on revenues of €5.2 billion; no taxation was paid on these profits. ALVE had never filed accounts in Ireland since 2003 as it was structured as an unlimited liability company (ULC); however, new EU accounts directives required ALVE to file Irish accounts in 2018. These accounts listed ALVE's registered office as the address of Ireland's largest tax-law firm, Matheson, who have been identified with Double Irish tax structures for Microsoft and Google.

In September 2021, the Irish Times reported that Abbott was using the Single Malt tax tool to shield profits on its COVID-19 testing kits.

Operations

Organization

Abbott's core businesses focus on diagnostics, medical devices, branded generic medicines and nutritional products, which have been supplemented through acquisitions.

, the firm's divisions are:
 Nutrition: Pediatric nutrition (e.g., Similac, Isomil, and Gain), Adult Nutrition (e.g., Ensure and ZonePerfect) and special dietary needs (e.g., Glucerna and Juven)
 Diagnostics: core lab, molecular, point of care, rapid diagnostics and Informatics
 Medical devices: rhythm management, electrophysiology, heart failure, structural heart, neuromodulation, diabetes care
 Established Pharmaceuticals: branded generic drugs sold exclusively in developing markets

Management

Miles D. White joined the company in 1984, holding positions including senior vice president of diagnostic operations, executive vice president, executive chairman, and CEO. In 1996, Robert B. Ford joined Abbott, holding various positions including executive vice president of the company's medical device business.

In November 2019, White announced that he was stepping down as CEO after 21 years. In March 2020, Robert B. Ford took over as president and CEO, and later chairman.

Recognition
Abbott was ranked 86th  on the Fortune 500 list of largest US-based corporations in 2022. Fortune also named Abbott as one of its Top 50 World's Most Admired Companies in 2021, among its Blue Ribbon companies in 2021, and to its Change the World list in 2020. In 2022, Abbott was ranked #10 in Fast Company’s Most Innovative Companies in Sports for Libre Sense and received an Honorable Mention for the World Changing Ideas Awards. The Galien Foundation named Abbott’s FreeStyle Libre as Best Medical Technology within the last 50 years (1970-2020).

The company has been listed on the  Seramount/Working Mother's "100 Best Companies" list for 21 years in a row, named a top company for executive women by Seramount, and included on Science magazine's Top 20 Employers list. The company has also been recognized as a top company by DiversityInc for diversity within the company for 19 consecutive years (2004-2022) and has been included on the Dow Jones Sustainability Index for 18 consecutive years.

Products

Nutrition
Pediatric nutrition products manufactured by Abbott Laboratories include:
 Similac
 Pedialyte
 PediaSure

Adult nutrition products manufactured by Abbott Laboratories include:
 Ensure
 Glucerna (Ensure Diabetes Care in India)
 Juven
 ZonePerfect

Diagnostics
Diagnostics products manufactured by Abbott include:
 i-STAT (While intended for a human audience, the point of care analyzers also demonstrate utility for the veterinary profession and are marketed by Abaxis.)
 Alinity
 Architect
 BinaxNOW

Medical devices
 FreeStyle Libre

Cardiovascular devices manufactured by Abbott Laboratories include:
 MitraClip
 Confirm Rx
 Amplatzer Piccolo Occluder
 Heartmate
 Xience
 CARDIOMEMS
 Gallant ICD
 CentriMag

Neuromodulation devices manufactured by Abbott Laboratories include:
 BurstDR Technology
 FlexBurst360 Technology
 Proclaim DRG Neurostimulation System
 Infinity Deep Brain Stimulation System
 Proclaim XR Recharge-Free Spinal Cord Stimulator
 NT2000IX Radiofrequency Generator
 Proclaim Elite Recharge-Free SCS System
 Prodigy MRI SCS System

Litigation and controversies

Humira
In March 2003, British company Cambridge Antibody Technology (CAT) stated its wish to "initiate discussions regarding the applicability of the royalty offset provisions for Humira" (Adalimumab) with Abbott Laboratories in the High Court of London. In December 2004, the judgment ruled for CAT.

Abbott was required to pay CAT US$255 million in lieu of  royalties the MRC, the Scripps Research Institute and Stratagene would have received on sales of Humira after December 2004. Some of this sum was to be passed to its partners in development, including US$191 million for the UK Medical Research Council (MRC), plus a further $7.5 million over five years from 2006 providing that Humira remained on the market.

Depakote
On 2 October 2012, the company was charged with a $500 million fine and $198.5 million forfeiture for illegal marketing of Depakote for uses not approved by the FDA. The court also sentenced Abbott to a five-year term of probation and court supervision. Shareholders then brought derivative suits against the company directors for breach of fiduciary duty. Following Abbott's spinoff of its research-based pharmaceuticals business, it no longer owns the commercial rights and associated responsibilities for Humira and Depakote.

Glucose monitors 
In 2021, two of Abbott Laboratories' subsidiaries, Arriva Medical LLC and Alere Inc, had to pay $160m to resolve claims that they had fraudulently billed Medicare for glucose monitors. The US Department of Justice said that Arriva used free glucose monitors to induce patients to order more consumable supplies, then took kickbacks on the increased sales. The company was also accused of charging Medicare for glucose monitors given to patients who were ineligible, or even dead.

Leuprorelin 
In October 2001, the US Department of Justice, states attorneys general, and TAP Pharmaceutical Products, a subsidiary of Abbott Laboratories, settled criminal and civil charges against TAP related to federal and state Medicare fraud and illegal marketing of the drug leuprorelin. TAP paid a total of $875 million,  a record high pharmaceutical settlement. This comprised $290 million for violating the Prescription Drug Marketing Act, $559.5 million to settle federal fraud charges for overcharging Medicare, and $25.5 million reimbursement to 50 states and Washington, D.C., for filing false claims with the states' Medicaid programs. The case arose under the False Claims Act with claims filed by Douglas Durand, a former TAP vice president of sales, and Joseph Gerstein, a doctor at Tufts University's HMO practice. Durand, Gerstein, and Tufts shared $95 million of the settlement.

There have since been various suits concerning leuprorelin use, none successful. They either concern the oversubscription of the drug or lack of warning about its side effects. Between 2010 and 2013, the FDA updated the Lupron drug label to include new safety information on the risk of thromboembolism, loss of bone density and convulsions. The FDA then said that the benefits of leuprorelin outweighed its risks when used according to its approved labeling.From 2017 the FDA  evaluated leuprorelin's connection to pain and discomfort in musculoskeletal and connective tissue.

Operation Headwaters 
In October 2003, Abbott Laboratories and two of its units agreed to pay a total of $600 million in the first combined civil settlement and criminal conviction for offering kickbacks to agents of "Operations Headwaters", an undercover investigation by the FBI.

Plant shutdown 
In February 2022, Abbott recalled baby formulas from the market and shut down their Michigan plant after complaints of infants being sick with serious bacterial infections while consuming formula product made at the Sturgis plant. The recall caused a nationwide shortage of formula milk, with at least 73% of baby products out of stock according to data firm Datasembly. Following Abbotts' meeting the initial requirement of the U.S. Food & Drug Administration, the facility reopened in June 2022.

Sponsorship
In 2015 Abbott became the title sponsor of the World Marathon Majors.

See also
 List of Illinois companies
 List of largest biomedical companies by market capitalization
 List of pharmaceutical companies
 Clara Abbott
 2022 United States infant formula shortage

Notes and references

External links

 

 
1888 establishments in Illinois
1920s initial public offerings

Biotechnology companies of the United States
Companies based in Lake County, Illinois
Pharmaceutical companies established in 1888
American companies established in 1888
Companies listed on the New York Stock Exchange
Multinational companies headquartered in the United States
Multinational health care companies
Lake Bluff, Illinois
Pharmaceutical companies of the United States
Veterinary medicine companies
Life sciences industry
Veterinary medicine in the United States